The Shah Abbas Mosque was a 17th-century mosque in Yerevan, Armenia. It was built during the rule of the Iranian Safavid king (Shah) Abbas I (the Great). The Shah Abbas Mosque in Ganja, was built at the same time.

See also
 Abbas Mirza Mosque, Yerevan
 Blue Mosque, Yerevan

Persian-Caucasian architecture
Mosques in Armenia
Safavid architecture
Monuments and memorials in Armenia
Armenia–Iran relations
Destroyed mosques
17th-century mosques
17th-century establishments in Iran